This is a list of the compositions of Malcolm Williamson. It is sorted chronologically by genre.

Operas

Our Man in Havana (1963), opera in three acts; based on the novel by Graham Greene, libretto by Sidney Gilliat
English Eccentrics (1964), chamber opera in two acts; based on the book by Edith Sitwell, libretto by Geoffrey Dunn
The Happy Prince (1965), opera in one act; libretto by the composer, after the short story by Oscar Wilde
Julius Caesar Jones (1965–66), children's opera in two acts; libretto by Geoffrey Dunn
The Violins of Saint-Jacques (1966), opera in three acts; based on the 1953 novel by Patrick Leigh Fermor, libretto by William Chappell
The Brilliant and the Dark (1966), choral operetta; libretto by Ursula Vaughan Williams
Dunstan and the Devil (1967), children's opera in one act; libretto by Geoffrey Dunn
The Growing Castle (1968), opera in two acts; based on A Dream Play by August Strindberg, libretto by the composer
Lucky Peter's Journey (1969), comedy in three acts; libretto by Edmund Tracey after the play  by August Strindberg
The Red Sea (1972), opera in one act; libretto by the composer

Ballets

The Display (1963), choreographed by Robert Helpmann
Sinfonietta (1965), symphonic work, choreographed in 1967 by Sir Frederick Ashton for the Royal Ballet
Sun into Darkness (1966), ballet in three acts
Perisynthion (1974), originally intended to be choreographed by Robert Helpmann, though (as yet) it has not been danced
Heritage (1985), ballet in three tableaux, choreographed by Phyllis Kempster for West Midlands Youth Ballet
Have Steps Will Travel (1988)

Cassations

Williamson used the word cassation in the sense of a miniature opera including audience participation. He wrote ten such works, of varying complexity and duration. His primary intention was to teach children the mechanics of putting on an opera, and the idea for the pieces first came to Williamson while teaching his own children about music. Williamson had a great deal of success with these cassations, which have had performances in Britain, Australia, France, the USA, and in hospitals in Tanzania and Zambia.
The Moonrakers (1967), premièred at the Trinity College of Music, London
Knights in Shining Armour (1968), for Peirs Russell-Cobb
The Snow Wolf (1968)
Genesis (1971), premièred by the Children's Choir Camp in the Diocese of Western North Carolina
The Stone Wall (1971), commissioned by the BBC Proms. Premièred at the Last Night of the Proms on 18 September 1971 by the BBC Symphony Orchestra conducted by Sir Colin Davis, in the Royal Albert Hall, London
The Winter Star (1973), commissioned by the Arts Council of Great Britain. Premièred on 19 June 1973 at the Holm Cultram Festival, directed by Andrew Seivewright
The Glitter Gang (1974), commissioned by the Australian Broadcasting Commission. Premièred at Sydney Town Hall on 23 February 1974 by children's choirs and the Sydney Symphony Orchestra, conducted by John Hopkins.
The Terrain of Kings (1974), commissioned by, and dedicated to, Jeunesses Musicales. Premièred in spring, 1975 in France.
The Valley and the Hill (1977), commissioned by the Liverpool Education Authority. Premièred in the presence of the Queen and the Duke of Edinburgh at Hope Street Cathedral on 21 June 1977, by the Royal Liverpool Philharmonic Orchestra and a cast of 18,000 children.
The Devil's Bridge (1982), premièred in Angoulême, France.

Orchestral works

 Santiago de Espada (1956), overture for orchestra
Symphony No. 1 – Elevamini (1957), for orchestra
Piano Concerto No. 1 (1958), for piano and orchestra
Piano Concerto No. 2 (1960), for piano and string orchestra
Organ Concerto (1961), for organ and orchestra
Piano Concerto No. 3 (1962), for piano and orchestra
Sinfonia Concertante (1962), for three trumpets and piano soli, and string orchestra
Our Man in Havana, Concert Suite (1963), for voices and orchestra
Our Man in Havana, Orchestral Suite (1963/66), for orchestra
The Display, Concert Suite (1964), for orchestra
The Merry Wives of Windsor (1964), for orchestra
Sinfonietta (1965), for orchestra
Violin Concerto (1965), for violin and orchestra
Concerto Grosso (1965), for orchestra
Symphonic Variations (1965), for orchestra
Serenade and Aubade (1965), for chamber orchestra
Sun into Darkness (1966), for orchestra
Six English Lyrics (1966–67), for low voice and strings
Epitaphs for Edith Sitwell (1966/72), for string orchestra
Symphony No. 2 – Pilgrim på havet (1968), for orchestra
A Word from Our Founder (1969), for orchestra
Symphony No. 3 – The Icy Mirror (1972), for soprano, mezzo-soprano and two baritone soli, SATB choir and orchestra
Concerto for Two Pianos and String Orchestra (1972)
Hammarskjöld Portrait (1974), song cycle for soprano and string orchestra
Perisynthion (1974), for orchestra
Les Olympiques (1976), song cycle for mezzo-soprano and string orchestra
Harp Concerto – Au tombeau du martyr juif inconnu (1976) for harp and string orchestra
The House of Windsor, Suite (1977), for orchestra (extracted from the music for the TV series)
Ochre (1977), for orchestra or organ and string orchestra
Symphony No. 4 – Jubilee (1977), for orchestra
Fiesta (1978), for orchestra
Azure (1978), for orchestra
Fanfarade (1979), for orchestra
Symphony No. 5 – Aquerò (1979–1980), for orchestra
Lament in Memory of Lord Mountbatten of Burma (1980), for violin and string orchestra
Ode for Queen Elizabeth (1980), for string trio and string orchestra
Tribute to a Hero (1981), for baritone and orchestra
In Thanksgiving – Sir Bernard Heinze (1982), for orchestra
Symphony No. 6 – Liturgy of Homage to the Australian Broadcasting Commission in its Fiftieth Year as University to the Australian Nation (1982), for orchestra
Two Pieces (circa 1983), for string orchestra
Camargue Scenes (198?), for string orchestra
Symphony No. 7 – Symphony for Strings (1984), for string orchestra
Cortège for a Warrior (1984), for orchestra
Lento for Strings (1985), for string orchestra
Heritage (1985), for orchestra
Next Year in Jerusalem (1985), song cycle for soprano and orchestra
Saxophone Concerto Concertino for Charles (1987), for saxophone and orchestral winds
Bicentennial Anthem (1988), for orchestra
Bratsvo – Brotherhood (1988), for orchestral winds
Piano Concerto No. 4 (1994), for piano and orchestra
A Year of Birds (1995), song cycle for soprano and orchestra
With Proud Thanksgiving (1995), for orchestra

Choral works

Two Motets (1954), for a cappella SATB choir
Mass (1956), for a cappella SATB choir
Adoremus (1959), Christmas cantata for alto and tenor soli, SATB choir and organ
Dawn Carol (1960), for a cappella SATB choir
Agnus Dei (1961), for SATB choir and organ
Dignus est Agnus (1961), for soprano solo, SATB choir and organ
Ascendit Deus (1961), for SATB choir and organ
Procession of Palms (1961), for SATB choir and organ
Tu es Petrus (1961), cantata for speaker, SATB choir and organ
Easter Carol (1962), for a cappella SATB choir
Harvest Thanksgiving (1962), for SATB and organ
Jesu, Lover of my Soul (1962), for soprano, alto, tenor, bass soli, SATB choir and organ
Let Them Give Thanks (1962), for congregation, SATB choir and organ
O Planctus (1962), for a cappella TB choir
Symphony for Voices (1962), for a cappella SATB choir
The Morning of the Day of Days (1962), for soprano and tenor soli, SATB choir and organ
Twelve New Hymn Tunes (1962), for unison/two-part choir and organ
Wrestling Jacob (1962), for soprano solo, SATB choir and organ
An Australian Carol (1963), for SATB choir and organ
Six Christmas Songs for the Young (1963), unison choir and piano, with optional percussion
Six Wesley Songs for the Young (1963), unison choir and piano
Good King Wenceslas (1963), for SATB choir and organ
Ding Dong Merrily on High (1963), for a cappella SATB choir
Te Deum (1963), for congregation, unison choir and organ
The Boar's Head Carol (1964), a cappella SATB choir
English Eccentrics Choral Suite (1964), for a cappella SATB double choir
Epiphany Carol (1964), for soprano solo, SATB choir and organ
Mass of Saint Andrew (1964), unison choir and organ/piano
Six Evening Hymns (1964), for a cappella unison choir
North Country Songs (1965), low voice solo, SATB choir and piano
Psalm of Praise (1965), for unison choir and organ
A Birthday (1966), for SATB choir and piano
Jenny Kiss'd Me (1966), for a cappella TB choir
Sweet and Low (1966), for SA choir and piano
Canon for Stravinsky (1967), for a cappella SATB choir
Mowing the Barley (1967), for SATB choir and orchestra
Six English Lyrics (1967), for SATB choir and string orchestra
Carol Arrangements (1969), for a cappella SATB double choir
O Sanctissima (1969), for SATB choir and piano
Sonnet "On Hearing the Dies Irae Sung in the Sistine Chapel" (1969), for a cappella SATB choir
The Brilliant and the Dark (1969), pageant for two soprano and two alto soli, SSAA choir and orchestra
Cantate Domino (1970), SATB choir and organ
I Will Lift Up Mine Eyes (1970), for unison choir, echo choir and organ
In Place of Belief (1970), for SATB choir and two pianos
Te Deum Laudamus (1971), for SATB choir, brass ensemble and organ
Love, the Sentinel (1972), for a cappella SATB choir
Carols of King David (1972), for congregation, unison choir and organ
O Jerusalem (1972), for congregation, unison choir and organ
The King of Love (1972), for congregation, unison choir and organ
The Musicians of Bremen (1972), for a cappella AATBarBB choir
Together in Unity (1972), for congregation, unison choir and organ
Canticle of Fire (1973), SATB choir and organ (with extensive org. solo passages)
Ode to Music (1973), for SATB choir, SATB echo choir and orchestra
Symphony No. 3 – The Icy Mirror (1973), for soprano, mezzo-soprano and two baritone soli, SATB choir and orchestra
The World at the Manger (1973), Christmas cantata for soprano and baritone soli, SATB choir and organ/piano duet
Communion Hallelujas (1974–75), for SATB choir and organ
Sixteen Hymns and Processionals (1975), for unison voices and piano/organ
This is my Father's World (1975), for SATB choir and organ
Love, Dove and Above Chorales (1975), for voices and piano/organ/guitar.
Mass of St. James (1975), for unison voices and organ/piano
Psalms of the Elements (1975), for unison voices/SATB choir and organ
Jubilee Hymn (1977), for unison choir, SATB choir and orchestra
This Christmas Night (1977), carol for SATB choir and piano/organ
Mass of Christ the King (1977–1978), for lyric soprano, dramatic soprano, tenor and baritone soli, SATB choir, SATB echo choir and orchestra
Kerygma (1979), for SATB choir and organ
Little Mass of Saint Bernadette (1980), unison choir, instrumental ensemble and organ
Mass of the People of God (1980), for SATB choir and organ
Three Choric Hymns (1980), for a cappella SATB choir
Now Is The Singing Day (1981), for mezzo-soprano and baritone soli, SATB choir, two pianos, percussion and string orchestra
Mass of Saint Margaret of Scotland (1982), unison choir/SATB choir and organ/piano
A Pilgrim Liturgy (1984), mezzo-soprano and baritone soli, SATB choir and orchestra
Songs for a Royal Baby (1985), for SATB soli/choir and string orchestra
Easter in St. Mary's Church (1987), for SATB choir and organ/piano
Galilee (1987), for a cappella SATB choir
A Book of Christmas Carols (1988), for unison voices and piano/organ
The True Endeavour (1988), for speaker, SATB choir and orchestra
The Dawn Is At Hand (1988–1989), for SATB choir and orchestra
Our Church Lives (1989), for SATB choir and organ
Beyond the Sun and the Moon (1990), for speaker, children's choir and orchestra
Mass of Saint Etheldreda (1990), for SATB choir and organ
Requiem for a Tribe Brother (1992), for a cappella SATB choir

Works for voice

A Vision of Beasts and Gods (1958), song cycle for high voice and piano
Celebration of Divine Love (1963), song cycle for high voice and piano
Hasselbacher's Scena (1963), for bass and piano
Three Shakespeare Songs (1963), for high voice and guitar/piano
A Christmas Carol (1964), for low voice and piano
North Country Songs (1965), for low voice and piano
Six English Lyrics (1966–67), for low voice and piano/strings
From a Child's Garden (1968), song cycle for high voice and piano
In Place of Belief (1970), for four solo voices and piano duet
Death of Cuchulain (1971), for five male voices and percussion
The Musicians of Bremen (1972), for six male voices
Pietà (1973), for soprano, oboe, bassoon and piano
Tribute to a Hero (1981), song cycle for voice and piano
Songs for a Royal Baby (1985), for soprano, alto, tenor, bass soli and piano/strings
Vocalise (1985), soprano and piano
Day that I have Loved (1986), for low voice and piano
Feast of Euridice (1986), for voice, flute, percussion and piano
The Mower to the Glow-worms (1986), for low voice and piano
The White Island (1986), for low voice and piano
White Dawns (1986), song cycle for baritone and piano
New work (1993), for voice and harp

Chamber music

String Quartet No. 2 (1954)
Variations (1964), for cello and piano
Concerto for Two Pianos and wind quintet (1965)
Pas de Quatre (1967), for flute, oboe, clarinet, bassoon and piano
Serenade (1967), for flute, piano, violin, viola and cello
Sonata for Two Pianos (1967)
Piano Quintet (1968), for two violins, viola, cello and piano
Pas de Deux (1972), for clarinet and piano
Adelaide Fanfare (1973), for two trumpets, two horns, two trombones, tuba and organ
Canberra Fanfare (1973), for two trumpets, two trombones and percussion
Music for a Quiet Day (1976), for concert band
Piano Trio (1976), for violin, cello and piano
Konstanz Fanfare (1980), for five trumpets, four horns, two tenor trombones, two bass trombones, tuba, two percussion and organ
Richmond Fanfare (1980), five trumpets, four horns, two tenor trombones, two bass trombones, tuba, percussion and organ
Fontainebleau Fanfare (1981), for five trumpets, four horns, two tenor trombones, two bass trombones, tuba, two percussion and organ
Champion Family Album (1984–85), for flute and clarinet, with optional guitar and percussion parts
Springtime on the River Moskva (1986), for two pianos
Pas de Trois (1987), for two pianos
Ceremony for Oodgeroo (1988), for brass quintet
Fanfare of Homage (1988), for military band
Channukkah Sketches (1990), for flute and guitar
Tableau No. 1 (1990), for two pianos
Fanfares and Chorales (1991), for brass quintet
String Quartet No. 3 (1993)

[the String Quartet No. 1, subtitled Winterset, which dates from 1947–48, remains unpublished.]

Works for solo instruments

Partita (1950), for piano
Variations (1954), for piano
Piano Sonata No. 1 (1956)
Fons Amoris (1956), for organ
Piano Sonata No. 2 (1957)
Piano Sonata No. 3 (1958)
Resurgence de Feu (1959), for organ
Piano Sonata No. 4 (1959)
Symphony (1960), for organ
Travel Diaries (1961), for piano
Vision of Christ-Phoenix (1962), for organ
Elegy for J.F.K. (1964), for organ
Epitaphs for Edith Sitwell (1966), for organ
Peace Pieces (1971), for organ
Little Carols of the Saints (1972), for organ
Partita on Themes of Walton (1972), for viola
Mass of a Medieval Saint (1973), for organ
Haifa Watercolours (1974), for piano
The Bridge Van Gogh Painted and the French Camargue (1974), for piano
Fantasy on This is my Father's World (1975), for organ
Fantasy on O Paradise (1976), for organ
Ritual of Admiration (1976), for piano
The Lion of Suffolk (1977), for organ
Mass of the People of God – Offertoire – Dialogue des Choeurs (1980), for organ
Hymna Titu (1984), for piano
Symphony Day that I have Loved (1994), for harp

Scores for film and TV

The Timber Getters (1949), Australian documentary
Inland with Sturt (1951), Australian film score
Arid Land (1960), film score
The Brides of Dracula (1960), Hammer horror film score
Thunder in Heaven (1964), travel documentary
North Sea Strike (1964), oil documentary
September Spring (1964), BP film
Rio Tinto Zinc (1965), TV documentary
Crescendo (1970), Hammer horror film score
The Horror of Frankenstein (1970), Hammer horror film score, directed by Jimmy Sangster
Nothing But the Night (1972), film score, starring Christopher Lee and Peter Cushing
Churchill's People (1974–75), many scores for TV-series
The House of Windsor (1977), TV-series score
Watership Down (1977), prologue and title music of film score
The Masks of Death (1984), Sherlock Holmes film score, with Peter Cushing

Musical theatre works

No Bed for Bacon (1958), for Bristol Old Vic
Make with the Mischief (1958), unperformed version of Shakespeare's A Midsummer Night's Dream
Trilby (1959–61), based on the novel by George du Maurier

Unfinished works

Williamson left a number of works unfinished at his death. These include a Strindberg-based opera Easter (with a libretto by Myfanwy Piper), a Symphony No. 8 Agamemnon (based on the poem by Dame Iris Murdoch), and sketches for a Piano Concerto No. 5, which he had hoped to write for his Australian friend, the pianist Antony Gray.

Sources
Malcolm Williamson: A Mischievous Muse (Paul Harris and Anthony Meredith), Boosey & Hawkes

References

 
Williamson, Malcolm